This is a list of Austrian football transfers in the  2016–17 winter transfer window. Only transfers of the Austrian Football Bundesliga and Austrian Football First League are listed.

Austrian Football Bundesliga

Note: Flags indicate national team as has been defined under FIFA eligibility rules. Players may hold more than one non-FIFA nationality.

FC Red Bull Salzburg

In:

Out:

SK Rapid Wien

In:

Out:

FK Austria Wien

In:

Out:

FC Admira Wacker Mödling

In:

Out:

SK Sturm Graz

In:

Out:

Wolfsberger AC

In:

Out:

SV Ried

In:

Out:

SC Rheindorf Altach

In:

Out:

SV Mattersburg

In:

Out:

SKN St. Pölten

In:

Out:

Austrian Football First League

LASK Linz

In:

Out:

FC Wacker Innsbruck

In:

Out:

FC Liefering

In:

Out:

SC Austria Lustenau

In:

Out:

Kapfenberger SV

In:

Out:

SC Wiener Neustadt

In:

Out:

Floridsdorfer AC

In:

Out:

SV Horn

In:

Out:

FC Blau-Weiß Linz

In:

Out:

WSG Wattens

In:

Out:

See also
 2016–17 Austrian Football Bundesliga
 2016–17 Austrian Football First League

References

External links
 Official site of the ÖFB
 Official site of the Bundesliga

Football transfers winter 2016–17
Transfers
2016–17